Elizabeta Pavlovska (born 24 September 1972) is a Macedonian hurdler. She competed in the women's 100 metres hurdles at the 1992 Summer Olympics as an Independent Olympic Participant.

References

External links
 

1972 births
Living people
Athletes (track and field) at the 1992 Summer Olympics
Macedonian female hurdlers
Olympic athletes as Independent Olympic Participants
Place of birth missing (living people)